Poland competed at the 2011 World Championships in Athletics from August 27 to September 4 in Daegu, South Korea.

Team selection

A team of 43 athletes was
announced to represent the country
in the event.  The team is led by the defending champions, pole vaulter Anna Rogowska and hammer thrower Anita Włodarczyk.

The following athletes appeared on the preliminary Entry List, but not on the Official Start List of the specific event, resulting in a total number of 37 competitors:

Medalists

Results

Men

Women

Combined events – Heptathlon

References

External links
Official local organising committee website
Official IAAF competition website

Nations at the 2011 World Championships in Athletics
World Championships in Athletics
Poland at the World Championships in Athletics